Berck is a surname. Notable people with the surname include:

Omer Berck (born 1895), Belgian fencer
Peter Berck (1950–2018), American economist

See also
Berk (name)

References